FC Tom-2 Tomsk was a Russian football team from Tomsk, founded in 2014. Since 2014–15 season, it played in the Russian Professional Football League (third level). It was a farm club for the Russian National Football League team FC Tom Tomsk. It was dissolved after the conclusion of the 2015–16 season, after Tom was promoted to the Russian Football Premier League, which holds its own Under-21 competition for the Premier League clubs.

References

External links
  Official website

Association football clubs established in 2014
Association football clubs disestablished in 2016
Defunct football clubs in Russia
Sport in Tomsk
FC Tom Tomsk
2014 establishments in Russia
2016 disestablishments in Russia